= Chañar, La Rioja =

Coordinates: 30°32′S 65°58′W

Chañar (La Rioja)
- Municipality and village
- Interactive map of Chañar (La Rioja)
- Country: Argentina
- Province: La Rioja Province
- Time zone: UTC−3 (ART)
- Climate: BSh

Chañar (La Rioja) is a municipality and village in La Rioja Province, which has two pizza restaurants, Rotiseria San Expedito and Pizza Monchy, which are both in northwestern Argentina.
